Los Tres Mosqueteros were a reggaeton trio consisting of MC Ceja and Lito & Polaco. Only one album was produced from this trio titled Los Tres Mosqueteros, in which each member appeared on the front cover of the album with a picture representing, a picture one would take before being incarcerated.

This group is no longer together due to a fallout, causing them to go their separate ways and starting a lyrical war between MC Ceja and Lito & Polaco y Polaco. After MC Ceja & Lito & Polaco broke up, DJ Eric made a new group who were also called Los 3 Mosqueteros. They came out with an album called De Vuelta Por Primera Vez. The group disappeared soon after.

Members
Alberto Mendoza Nieves, otherwise known as MC Ceja, was born on February 15, 1978, in Arecibo, Puerto Rico. Other aliases include El Cejón, or El C-jón.
Lito & Polaco named as Rafael Sierra & Rafael Omar Molina ((see Down))
Rafael Sierra, also known as Lito from Carolina, Puerto Rico.
Rafael Omar Molina, also known as Polaco from Carolina, Puerto Rico

Discography
 Los Tres Mosqueteros (1997)

Reggaeton groups
Puerto Rican musical groups
Musical groups established in 1997